Santa Monica, officially the Municipality of Santa Monica (Surigaonon: Lungsod nan Santa Monica), is a 5th class municipality in the province of Surigao del Norte, Philippines. According to the 2020 census, it has a population of 9,423 people.

It is also known as Sapao. Santa Monica is one of the two northernmost towns of Siargao Island. The other is the municipality of Burgos.

Geography

Barangays
Santa Monica is politically subdivided into 11 barangays.
 Abad Santos
 Alegria 
 Bailan 
 Garcia 
 Libertad 
 Mabini 
 Mabuhay (Poblacion) 
 Magsaysay 
 Rizal 
 T. Arlan (Poblacion) 
 Tangbo

Climate

Demographics

Economy

References

External links
 Santa Monica Profile at PhilAtlas.com
 Santa Monica Profile at the DTI Cities and Municipalities Competitive Index
 [ Philippine Standard Geographic Code]
 Philippine Census Information
 Local Governance Performance Management System

Municipalities of Surigao del Norte